Lund is a city in the province of Scania (Skåne), southern Sweden.

Lund may also refer to:

Places

Canada
Lund, British Columbia, an unincorporated village

Denmark
, in Horsens Municipality

England
Lund, East Riding of Yorkshire, a village near Beverley
Lund, North Yorkshire, a hamlet near Selby, in the East Riding of Yorkshire until 1974

Sweden
Lund, Gävle, a locality

Norway
Lund, Norway, a municipality in Rogaland county
Lund, Kristiansand, a borough in the city of Kristiansand in Agder county
Lund, Namsos, a village in the municipality of Namsos in Trøndelag county

United States
Lund Township, Douglas County, Minnesota
Lund, Nevada, a small town and census-designated place
Lund, Texas, an unincorporated community
Lund, Utah, an unincorporated village
Lund, Wisconsin, an unincorporated community

Other
Lund (surname), a name of Old Norse and Old English origin, including a list of people and a fictional character
Lund Highway, a road locating in southern Utah
Lund tramway, Lund, Sweden
Lund University, Lund, Sweden

See also 
Lund Principle, in ecumenical relations between Christian churches
Lund's Anarchist Group, a former Swedish organisation
Lund's amphibious rat, a mammal of southeastern South America.
Lund's Atlantic tree-rat, a mammal found in Brazil
Lund's Blue Anchor Line, a former shipping company which operated between the United Kingdom, South Africa and Australia
Lund's Bristol ware, porcelain
Lund's fly, an insect originally from tropical Africa
Lund's node, in the gall bladder
Lund's teiid, a lizard found in Brazil
Lund's Tower, a folly in North Yorkshire, England
Lundavra, Queensland, a rural locality in Australia
Lunden (disambiguation)
Lunds, supermarket chain in Minnesota
Lunds, Wisconsin, an unincorporated community
Lunds & Byerlys, an American supermarket operator
LundXY, a Danish angel investment and startup catalyst firm
White Lund Industrial Estate, the main employment area in Morecambe